Table tennis was one of the first sports to be featured in the 1960 Summer Paralympics and is still contested today in the Summer Paralympics. Para table tennis is the third biggest Paralympic sport behind swimming and athletics.

Medalists

Defunct events
List of Paralympic medalists in table tennis (doubles' events) (1960 - 1976)

Current events
List of Paralympic medalists in table tennis (men's singles) (1960 - present)
List of Paralympic medalists in table tennis (women's singles) (1960 - present)
List of Paralympic medalists in table tennis (men's teams) (1972 - present)
List of Paralympic medalists in table tennis (women's teams) (1972 - present)

See also
List of Olympic medalists in table tennis

References

Table tennis at the Summer Paralympics
Table tennis at multi-sport events
Lists of Paralympic medalists
Para table tennis